Bernabé Magaña Cisneros (born August 16, 1993) is an American soccer player who currently plays as a goalkeeper for Los Angeles Force.

Career statistics

Club

Notes

References

1993 births
Living people
American soccer players
American expatriate soccer players
Association football goalkeepers
National Independent Soccer Association players
Club Universidad Nacional footballers
Venados F.C. players
Los Angeles Force players
Expatriate footballers in Mexico
American expatriate sportspeople in Mexico